David William Sanborn (born July 30, 1945) is an American alto saxophonist. Though Sanborn has worked in many genres, his solo recordings typically blend jazz with instrumental pop and R&B. He released his first solo album Taking Off in 1975, but has been playing the saxophone since before he was in high school.

One of the most commercially successful American saxophonists to earn prominence since the 1980s, Sanborn is described by critic Scott Yannow as "the most influential saxophonist on pop, R&B, and crossover players of the past 20 years." He is often identified with radio-friendly smooth jazz, but he has expressed a disinclination for the genre and his association with it.

Early life
Sanborn was born in Tampa, Florida, and grew up in Kirkwood, Missouri. He suffered from polio for eight years in his youth. He began playing saxophone on a physician's advice to strengthen his weakened chest muscles and improve his breathing, instead of studying piano. Alto saxophonist Hank Crawford, at the time a member of Ray Charles's band, was an early and lasting influence on Sanborn.

Sanborn attended college at Northwestern University and studied music. But he transferred to the University of Iowa where he played and studied with saxophonist J.R. Monterose.

Career
Sanborn performed with blues musicians Albert King and Little Milton at the age of 14. He continued playing blues when he joined Paul Butterfield blues band in 1967. 

Sanborn recorded on four Butterfield albums as a horn section member and soloist from 1967 to 1971. In the early morning of Monday, August 18, 1969 Sanborn appeared as a member of the band at the Woodstock Music Festival at Bethel, NY.

In 1972 Sanborn played on the track "Tuesday Heartbreak" on the Stevie Wonder album Talking Book. His work in 1975 with David Bowie on Young Americans and on the James Taylor recording of "How Sweet it Is (To Be Loved by You)" on the album Gorilla further brought to prominence his alto saxophone voice in popular music.

In the mid-70s Sanborn became active in the popular jazz fusion scene by joining the Brecker Brothers band where he became influenced by Michael Brecker, and it was with the brothers that he recorded his first solo album, Taking Off, nowadays regarded as something of a jazz/funk classic.

Although Sanborn is most associated with smooth jazz, he studied free jazz in his youth with saxophonists Roscoe Mitchell and Julius Hemphill. In 1993, he revisited this genre when he appeared on Tim Berne's Diminutive Mysteries, dedicated to Hemphill. Sanborn's album Another Hand featured avant-garde musicians.

In 1985 Sanborn and Al Jarreau played two sold-out concerts at Chastain Park in Atlanta.

Recordings
He has been a highly regarded session player since the late 1960s, playing with an array of well-known artists, such as James Brown, Bryan Ferry, Michael Stanley, Eric Clapton, Bobby Charles, Cat Stevens, Roger Daltrey, Stevie Wonder, Paul Simon, Jaco Pastorius, the Brecker Brothers, Michael Franks, Kenny Loggins, Casiopea, Players Association, David Bowie, Todd Rundgren, Bruce Springsteen, Little Feat, Tommy Bolin, Bob James, James Taylor, Al Jarreau, Pure Prairie League, Kenny G, Loudon Wainwright III, George Benson, Joe Beck, Donny Hathaway, Elton John, Gil Evans, Carly Simon, Guru, Linda Ronstadt, Billy Joel, Kenny Garrett, Roger Waters, Steely Dan, Ween, the Eagles, The Grateful Dead, Nena, Hikaru Utada, The Rolling Stones, Ian Hunter, and Toto.

Many of his solo recordings were collaborations with the bassist/multi-instrumentalist/composer and producer Marcus Miller, who he met in the Saturday Night Live band in the late 1970s.

Sanborn performed with Eric Clapton on film soundtracks such as Lethal Weapon (and its sequels) and Scrooged.

In 1991 Sanborn recorded Another Hand, which the All Music Guide to Jazz described as a "return by Sanborn to his real, true love: unadorned (or only partly adorned) jazz" that "balanced the scales" against his smooth jazz material. The album, produced by Hal Willner, featured musicians from outside the smooth jazz scene, such as Charlie Haden, Jack DeJohnette, Bill Frisell, and Marc Ribot.

In 1994 Sanborn appeared in A Celebration: The Music of Pete Townshend and The Who, also known as Daltrey Sings Townshend. This was a two-night concert at Carnegie Hall produced by Roger Daltrey of English rock band The Who in celebration of his fiftieth birthday. In 1994 a CD and a VHS video were issued, and in 1998 a DVD was released. In 1995 he performed in The Wizard of Oz in Concert: Dreams Come True a musical performance of the popular story at Lincoln Center to benefit the Children's Defense Fund. The performance was broadcast on Turner Network Television (TNT) and issued on CD and video in 1996.

In 2006, he was featured in Gordon Goodwin's Big Phat Band's album The Phat Pack on the track "Play That Funky Music", a remake of the Wild Cherry hit in a big band style. Sanborn often performs at Japan's Blue Note venues in Nagoya, Osaka, and Tokyo. He plays on the song "Your Party" on Ween's 2007 release La Cucaracha. On April 8, 2007, Sanborn sat in with the Allman Brothers Band during their annual run at the Beacon Theatre in New York City.

In 2010, Sanborn toured primarily with a trio featuring jazz organist Joey DeFrancesco and Steve Gadd where they played the combination of blues and jazz from his album Only Everything. In 2011, Sanborn toured with keyboardist George Duke and bassist Marcus Miller as the group DMS. In 2013, Sanborn toured with keyboardist Brian Culbertson on "The Dream Tour" celebrating the 25th anniversary of the song "The Dream."

Besides playing alto saxophone, Sanborn also plays piano on some of his recordings.

Broadcasting
Sanborn has performed and hosted radio, television, and web programs. He was a member of the Saturday Night Live Band in 1980. From the late 1980s he was a regular guest member of Paul Shaffer's band on Late Night with David Letterman. He also appeared a few times on the Late Show with David Letterman in the 90s.

From 1988 to 1989, he co-hosted Night Music, a late-night music show on NBC television with Jools Holland. Following producer Hal Willner's eclectic approach, the show positioned Sanborn with many famed musicians, such as Miles Davis, Dizzy Gillespie, Pharoah Sanders, Eric Clapton, Robert Cray, Lou Reed, Elliott Sharp, Jean-Luc Ponty, Santana, Todd Rundgren, Youssou N'dour, Pere Ubu, Loudon Wainwright III, Mary Margaret O'Hara, Screamin' Jay Hawkins, Leonard Cohen, Was (Not Was), Anson Funderburgh, John Zorn, and Curtis Mayfield.

During the 1980s and 1990s, Sanborn hosted a syndicated radio program, The Jazz Show with David Sanborn.

Sanborn has recorded many shows' theme songs (most notably the one for L.A. Law) as well as several other songs for The Late Late Show with Tom Snyder.

In 2021 as the coronavirus pandemic paused live music performances in public venues, Sanborn hosted a series master classes on Zoom and also virtual productions of "Sanborn Sessions" with artists such as Marcus Miller, Christian McBride, Sting, Michael McDonald, which involved live performances and interviews from his home in Westchester, N.Y.

Equipment
Sanborn plays a Selmer Mark VI alto saxophone. In the early 1980s he was endorsed by Yamaha and played their saxophones on the albums As We Speak and Backstreet and can be seen playing a Yamaha saxophone at the Montreux Jazz Festival in 1981.  

According to an April 1988 interview published in the jazz magazine DownBeat, he has a preference for Selmer Mark VI alto saxophones in the 140,000-150,000 serial number range, all produced in 1967. From the late 70s Sanborn played mouthpieces created by Bobby Dukoff. He is currently playing a mouthpiece designed by Aaron Drake.

Awards and honors
He has won six Grammy Awards and has had eight gold albums and one platinum album.

Sanborn won Grammy Awards for Voyeur (1981), Double Vision (1986), and the instrumental album Close Up (1988).

In 2004, Sanborn was inducted into the St. Louis Walk of Fame.

Discography

As leader 

 Taking Off (Warner Bros., 1975)
 David Sanborn (Warner Bros., 1976)
 Promise Me the Moon (Warner Bros., 1977)
 Heart to Heart (Warner Bros., 1978)
 Hideaway (Warner Bros., 1980) – #2 jazz hit; #33 R&B hit
 Voyeur (Warner Bros., 1980) – #1 jazz hit
 As We Speak (Warner Bros., 1982) – #1 jazz hit
 Backstreet (Warner Bros., 1983) – #1 jazz hit
 Straight to the Heart (Warner Bros., 1984) – live. #1 jazz hit.
 Double Vision with Bob James (Warner Bros., 1986)
 A Change of Heart (Warner Bros., 1987)
 Close-Up (Reprise, 1988)
 Another Hand (Elektra Musician, 1991)
 Upfront (Elektra, 1992)
 Hearsay (Elektra, 1994)
 Pearls (Elektra, 1995)
 Songs from the Night Before (Elektra Entertainment, 1996)
 Inside (Elektra, 1999)
 Time Again (Verve, 2003)
 Closer (Verve, 2005)
 Here and Gone (Decca, 2008)
 Only Everything (Decca, 2010)
 Quartette Humaine with Bob James (Okeh, 2013)
 Time and the River (Okeh, 2015)

Compilations
 Dreaming Girl (Wea, 2008)
 Love Songs (Warner Bros., 1995)
 Anything You Want (Cherry Red, 2020) [3 CDs]
 Then Again: The Anthology (Rhino, 2012) [2 CDs]

As guest
  Arif Mardin, All My Friends Are Here (NuNoise, 2010) – "So Blue"

As sideman 

With George Benson
 1975: Good King Bad (CTI, 1976)
 1975 Pacific Fire (CTI, 1983)
 1983: In Your Eyes (Warner Bros., 1983)

With James Brown
 Hell (Polydor, 1974)
 Reality (Polydor, 1974)

With the Brecker Brothers
 The Brecker Bros. (Arista, 1975)
 Back to Back (Arista, 1976)
 Return of the Brecker Brothers (GRP, 1992)

With Randy Brecker
 The Brecker Brothers Band Reunion (Piloo, 2013)
 Rocks (Piloo, 2019)

With Paul Butterfield
 The Resurrection of Pigboy Crabshaw (Elektra, 1967)
 In My Own Dream (Elektra, 1968)
 Keep on Moving (Elektra, 1969)
 Sometimes I Just Feel Like Smilin (Elektra, 1971)
 Better Days (Bearsville, 1973)
 Put It in Your Ear (Bearsville, 1976)
 Live: New York, 1970 (RockBeat, 2015)[2CD] – live rec. 1970
 The Paul Butterfield Blues Band Live At Woodstock (Run Out Groove, 2020)[2LP] – live rec. 1969

With Ron Carter
 Anything Goes (Kudu, 1975)
 Yellow & Green (CTI, 1987) – in bonus tracks

With Gil Evans
 Svengali (Atlantic, 1973)
 The Gil Evans Orchestra Plays the Music of Jimi Hendrix (RCA Victor, 1974)
 Montreux Jazz Festival '74 (Philips, 1975)
 There Comes a Time (RCA, 1976)
 Gil Evans Live at the Royal Festival Hall London 1978 (RCA Victor, 1979)
 Priestess (Antilles, 1983) – live rec. 1977

With Maynard Ferguson
 Primal Scream (Columbia, 1976)
 Maynard (Columbia, 1981) – compilation
 Hollywood (Columbia, 1982)

With Michael Franks
 The Art of Tea (Warner Bros., 1976)
 Sleeping Gypsy (Warner Bros., 1977)
 Tiger in the Rain (Warner Bros., 1979)
 Objects of Desire (Warner Bros., 1982)
 Skin Dive (Warner Bros., 1985)
 Abandoned Garden (Warner Bros., 1995)

With Bob James
 Heads (Tappan Zee/Columbia, 1977)
 Touchdown (Tappan Zee/Columbia, 1978)
 Lucky Seven (Tappan Zee/Columbia, 1979)
 Foxie (Tappan Zee/Columbia, 1983)

With Al Jarreau
 Heart's Horizon (Reprise, 1988)
 Tenderness (Reprise, 1994) – live

With Steve Khan
 Tightrope (Tappan Zee/Columbia, 1977)
 The Blue Man (Columbia, 1978)
 Arrows (Columbia, 1979)

With Lisa Lauren
 What Comes Around (Planet Jazz, 1998)
 My Own Twist (Planet Jazz, 2001)
 It Is What It Is (Planet Jazz, 2004)
 Lisa Lauren Loves the Beatles (Planet Jazz, 2006)

With The Manhattan Transfer
 The Manhattan Transfer (Atlantic, 1975)
 Brasil (Atlantic, 1987) – 1 track

With Pure Prairie League
 Can't Hold Back (RCA, 1979)
 Firin' Up (Casablanca, 1980)
 Something in the Night (Casablanca, 1981)

With Kenny Loggins
 High Adventure (Columbia, 1982)
 Vox Humana (Columbia, 1985)

With Carly Simon
 Boys in the Trees (Elektra, 1978)
 Spy (Elektra, 1979)
 Torch (Warner Bros., 1981)
 Hello Big Man (Warner Bros., 1983)

With Mike Stern
 Neesh (Trio, 1985)
 Upside Downside (Atlantic, 1986)
 Give and Take (Atlantic, 1997)

With James Taylor
 Gorilla (Warner Bros., 1975)
 JT (Columbia, 1977)
 Flag (Columbia, 1979)
 That's Why I'm Here (Columbia, 1985)

With John Tropea
 Tropea (Marlin, 1975)
 To Touch You Again (Marlin, 1979)

With others
 B.B. King, Guess Who (ABC, 1972)
 Loudon Wainwright III, Album III (Columbia, 1972)
 Idris Muhammad, House of the Rising Sun (Kudu, 1972)
 Stevie Wonder, Talking Book (Tamla, 1972)
 Michael Stanley, Friends and Legends (MCA, 1973)
 Todd Rundgren, A Wizard, a True Star (Bearsville, 1973)
 O'Donel Levy, Everything I Do Gonna Be Funky (Groove Merchant, 1974)
 Joe Beck, Beck (Kudu, 1975)
 David Bowie, Young Americans (RCA, 1975) – rec. 1974-75
 Hubert Laws, The Chicago Theme (CTI, 1975)
 Tommy Bolin, Teaser (Nemperor, 1975)
 Todd Rundgren, Initiation (Bearsville, 1975)
 Michael Bolton, Michael Bolotin (RCA Victor, 1975)
 Paul Simon, Still Crazy After All These Years (Columbia, 1975)
 Cat Stevens, Numbers (Island, 1975)
 Mark Murphy, Mark Murphy Sings (Muse, 1975)
 Bruce Springsteen, Born to Run (Columbia, 1975)
 Jaco Pastorius, Jaco Pastorius (Epic, 1976) – rec. 1975
 Phoebe Snow, Second Childhood (Columbia, 1976)
 Michael Stanley, Ladies' Choice (Epic, 1976)
 Larry Coryell, Aspects (Arista, 1976)
 Ian Hunter, All American Alien Boy (Columbia, 1976)
 Elton John, Blue Moves (MCA, 1976)
 Mose Allison, Your Mind Is on Vacation (Atlantic, 1976)
 Burt Bacharach, Futures (A&M, 1977)
 Mike Mainieri, Love Play (Arista, 1977)
 Garland Jeffreys, Ghost Writer (A&M, 1977)
 Don McLean, Prime Time (Arista, 1977)
 Linda Ronstadt, Living in the USA (Asylum, 1978)
 Steve Forbert, Alive on Arrival (Nemperor, 1978)
 David Clayton-Thomas, Clayton (ABC, 1978)
 Garland Jeffreys, One-Eyed Jack (A&M, 1978)
 Chaka Khan, Chaka (Warner Bros., 1978) – rec. 1977–78
 Dr. John, City Lights (Horizon, 1978)
 Melanie, Phonogenic Not Just Another Pretty Face (MCA, 1978)
 Flora Purim, Everyday Everynight (Warner Bros., 1978)
 Tony Williams, The Joy of Flying (Columbia, 1978)
 The Eagles, The Long Run (Asylum, 1979)
 Tim Curry, Fearless (A&M, 1979)
 John McLaughlin, Electric Dreams (Columbia, 1979) – rec. 1978
 Bonnie Raitt, The Glow (Warner Bros., 1979)
 J.D. Souther, You're Only Lonely (Columbia, 1979)
 Eagles, The Long Run (Asylum, 1979) – rec. 1978–79
 Steely Dan, Gaucho (MCA, 1980) – rec. 1978–80
 Aretha Franklin, Aretha (Arista, 1980)
 James Last, The Seduction (Polydor, 1980)
 Rickie Lee Jones, Pirates (Warner Bros., 1981) – rec. 1980–81
 Larry Carlton, Sleepwalk (Warner Bros., 1982)
 Garland Jeffreys, Guts for Love (Epic, 1982)
 Gloria Gaynor, Gloria Gaynor (Warner Bros., 1982)
 Randy Crawford, Windsong (Warner Bros., 1982)
 Karla Bonoff, Wild Heart of the Young (Columbia, 1982)
 Billy Joel, An Innocent Man (Columbia, 1983)
 Bob Mintzer, Papa Lips (Eastworld, 1983)
 The Rolling Stones, Undercover (Rolling Stones, 1983) – rec. 1982–83
 Earl Klugh, Wishful Thinking (EMI, 1984) – rec. 1983
 Dave Grusin, Night-Lines (GRP, 1984) – rec. 1983
 Roger Waters, The Pros and Cons of Hitch Hiking (Columbia, 1984) – rec. 1983
 John Scofield, Electric Outlet (Gramavision, 1984)
 Nena, ? (Nena album) (CBS, 1984) – rec. 1983
 Bryan Ferry, Boys and Girls (E.G., 1985) – 1 track
 Kazumi Watanabe, Mobo Splash (Domo, 1985)
 Toto, Fahrenheit (Columbia, 1986)
 Hiram Bullock, From All Sides (Atlantic, 1986)
 Ronnie Cuber, Pin Point (Electric Bird, 1986)
 Patty Smyth, Never Enough (Columbia, 1987) – rec. 1986
 Mick Jagger, Primitive Cool (Columbia, 1987) – rec. 1986–87
 Janis Siegel, At Home (Atlantic, 1987)
 Hiram Bullock, Give It What U Got (Atlantic, 1987)
 Brenda Russell, Get Here (A&M, 1988) – rec. 1985–87
 Robert Cray, Don't Be Afraid of the Dark (Mercury, 1988)
 Roberta Flack, Oasis (Atlantic, 1988)
 Eric Clapton, Journeyman (Reprise, 1989)
 Shawn Colvin, Steady On (Columbia, 1989)
 Eddie Palmieri, Sueño (Intuition, 1989)
 Tim Berne, Diminutive Mysteries (JMT, 1993) – rec. 1992
 Paul Shaffer, The World's Most Dangerous Party (Capitol, 1993)
 Oleta Adams, Evolution (Fontana, 1993)
 John McLaughlin, The Promise (Verve, 1995)
 Larry Goldings, Whatever It Takes (Warner Bros., 1995)
 Candy Dulfer, Big Girl (RCA, 1996)
 Ricky Peterson, Souvenir (Windham Hill Jazz, 1999)
 Jason Miles, Celebrating the Music of Weather Report (Telarc, 2000)
 Take 6, Beautiful World (Warner Bros., 2002)
 Randy Brecker, 34th N Lex (ESC, 2003) – rec. 2002
 Chris Botti, To Love Again: The Duets (Columbia, 2005)
 Gordon Goodwin's Big Phat Band, The Phat Pack (Immergent, 2006)
 Livingston Taylor, There You Are Again (Whistling Dog Music, 2006)
 Bobby Hutcherson, Enjoy the View (Blue Note, 2014)
 Jimmy Chamberlin and Frank Catalano, Bye Bye Blackbird (Ropeadope, 2016)

Video 
 Love and Happiness (1986)
 The Super Session (1997) - David Sanborn & Friends
 The Super Session II (1998) - David Sanborn & Friends
 Legends: Live at Montreux 1997 (2005)
 The Legends of Jazz: Showcase (2006)
 Live at Montreux 1984 (2009)

Filmography

Actor/Host
 The Wizard of Oz in Concert: Dreams Come True (1995)Cast member in the TV stage musical
 Scrooged (1988)Played a street musician
 Sunday Night (1988)Was the host of this music show
 Magnum P.I. (1986)Was guest saxophonist in the episode L.A.
 Stelle Sulla Citta (1983)

Himself
 Saturday Night Live (March 15, 1980)
 One Trick Pony (1980)
 Late Night with David Letterman / Late Show with David Letterman (occasionally, 1986–2010)
 The 1st Annual Soul Train Music Awards (1987)
 The 2nd Annual Soul Train Music Awards (1988)
 Benny Carter: Symphony in Riffs (1989)
 Michael Kamen: Concerto for Saxophone (1991)
 Celebration: The Music of Pete Townshend and The Who (1994)
 Forget Paris (1995)
 Burt Bacharach: One Amazing Night (1995)
 The Kennedy Center Honors: A Celebration of the Performing Arts (1996)
 Eric Clapton & Friends in Concert (1999)

Composer
 Moment to Moment (1975)
 Stelle Sulla Citta (1983)
 Finnegan Begin Again (1985)
 Psycho III (1986)
 Lethal Weapon 2 (1989)
 Lethal Weapon 3 (1992)
 Lethal Weapon 4 (1998)

Musician
 Saturday Night Live (1975)
 Murphy's Romance (1985)
 Psycho III (1986)
 Lethal Weapon (1987)
 Tequila Sunrise (1988)
 Lethal Weapon 2 (1989)
 Lethal Weapon 3 (1992)
 Forget Paris (1995)
 Lethal Weapon 4 (1998)

References

External links

 
 
 Interview by Pete Lewis, Blues & Soul, September 2008
 Interview , RundgrenRadio.com
The Greatest Ears in Town: The Arif Mardin Story (EPK) on YouTube
Chaka Khan - So Blue on YouTube

1945 births
21st-century American saxophonists
American jazz alto saxophonists
American jazz soprano saxophonists
American male saxophonists
American jazz pianists
American session musicians
American television hosts
Bienen School of Music alumni
Grammy Award winners
Jazz radio presenters
Jazz soprano saxophonists
Living people
Music of St. Louis
Musicians from Tampa, Florida
Paul Butterfield Blues Band members
People from St. Louis County, Missouri
People with polio
Warner Records artists
Verve Records artists
Saturday Night Live Band members
Smooth jazz saxophonists
Jazz musicians from Missouri
21st-century American male musicians
American male jazz musicians